Lewis Island is an island in the U.S. state of Georgia.

Lewis Island most likely has the name of an original owner of the site.

References

Landforms of McIntosh County, Georgia
Islands of Georgia (U.S. state)